Ràdio 4 is a Spanish free-to-air radio station owned and operated by Radio Nacional de España (RNE), the radio division of state-owned public broadcaster Radiotelevisión Española (RTVE). It is the corporation's Catalan language radio station, and is available in Catalonia and Andorra. It was launched on 13 December 1976.

History
Ràdio 4 was launched in 1976 during the Spanish transition to democracy, and was integrated into a regional countrywide Radio 4 network in 1988 after the closure of the state-owned but commercially funded Radiocadena Española in that same year. The integrated regional countrywide Radio 4 network was shut down in 1991 due to poor ratings, and RNE Ràdio 4 once again became a standalone radio station.

In 2006 however, RNE Ràdio 4 was itself threatened with the prospect of closure due to a very low audience share (only 8,500 listeners in Catalonia out of a population of 7.5 million people). This sparked a campaign against closure of the station, which eventually proved successful after Santiago Gonzalez, the then newly appointed director of RNE (Radio Nacional de España), decided against closing Ràdio 4.

Logos

References

External links

 Ràdio 4 on RTVE Play

Mass media in Barcelona
Radio stations in Spain
Radio stations established in 1976
RTVE